The Ambassador Extraordinary and Plenipotentiary of the Russian Federation to the Republic of Benin is the official representative of the President and the Government of the Russian Federation to the President and the Government of Benin.

The ambassador and his staff work at large in the Embassy of Russia in Cotonou. Since 1992 the Russian Ambassador to Benin has been concurrently accredited to Togo.

History of diplomatic relations

Diplomatic relations at the mission level between the Soviet Union and what was then the Republic of Dahomey were first established in June 1962, and carried out through the Soviet embassy in Togo. The first Soviet ambassador, the incumbent ambassador to Togo, was dual accreditation on 10 August 1963. The Soviet embassy in Dahomey opened in May 1966, with  appointed ambassador solely to Dahomey on 4 May 1966. The Republic of Dahomey was renamed the Republic of Benin in 1975, and with the dissolution of the Soviet Union in 1991, the Soviet ambassador, Vitaly Zhuravlyov, continued as representative of the Russian Federation until 1992. Zhuravlyov's successor, was appointed as ambassador to Benin and concurrently to Togo.

List of representatives (1963 – present)

Representatives of the Soviet Union to the Republic of Dahomey (1963 – 1975)

Representatives of the Soviet Union to the Republic of Benin (1975 – 1991)

Representatives of the Russian Federation to the Republic of Benin (1991 – present)

References

 
Benin
Russia